This is the inaugural season for X-League Indoor Football.

Standings

 z-Indicates best regular season record
 x-Indicates clinched playoff berth

Schedule

*All Game times are Eastern Standard Time

Playoffs

External links
 2014 XLIF Schedule